La Múcura (the earthenware jar, :es:múcura) is a traditional Colombian cumbia song.

The lyrics begin:
La múcura está en el suelo, mamá, no puedo con ella. Me la arrebató una estrella..

It was composed by Crescencio Salcedo a flute player who also composed Mi cafetal, and has received many recorded versions. In 1948 by Los Trovadores de Barú for Fuentes, then in 1950 entering Mexican cinema in versions by Ninón Sevilla and Pérez Prado. Little Jug by Johnny Martin 1950 was an English-lyric version.

Music

Rhythmically, the song is an example of a cumbia or Afro-Caribbean rhythm that may have originally been used for courtship rituals among Africans.  The word cumbia itself may be related to cumbé, a Kongo word meaning "noise" that may be at the root of other Spanish words as well, viz. "cumbancha," a noisy party.

Lyrics

The song's lyrics are an example of double entendre ("doble sentido" in Spanish) in Hispanic popular song, according to social scientist Marcelino Canino Salgado. The image of the broken water jug (el cántaro roto) is an old and common metaphor for the loss of virginity in Latin and Latin American culture. The word "múcura" was once thought of has having precolombian origins but it is in fact of likely Kikuyu African origin.  Its meaning, in Colombian Spanish, is the same as "cántaro", namely, a clay jug.

References

Spanish-language songs